Ackley Wildlife Area is a tract of protected land located in southern Langlade County, Wisconsin, managed by the Wisconsin Department of Natural Resources (WDNR).

History
The earliest logging activities in the general vicinity first occurred in the late 1800s. In the early 1900s, deforestation and farming attempts had made the area particularly susceptible to wildfires, all of which reduced the once great tree cover to grasses, shrubs and aspen. These new growth flora allowed for the water table to rise, and subsequently, stocks of sharp-tailed grouse and other similar fauna rose. The Ackley Wildlife Area was founded in 1951 to allow for the management of hunting in the property.

References

External links
 Ackley Wildlife Area primary map at the WDNR Website. Retrieved February 3, 2023.
 Ackley Wildlife Area secondary map at the WDNR Website. Retrieved February 3, 2023.
 Original Ackley Wildlife Area map at the Langlade County Website. Retrieved February 3, 2023.

State Wildlife Area
Protected areas of Wisconsin
Geography of Langlade County, Wisconsin
Protected areas established in 1951